Pastoral counseling is a branch of counseling in which psychologically trained ministers, rabbis, priests, imams,  and other persons provide therapy services. Pastoral counselors often integrate modern psychological thought and method with traditional religious training in an effort to address psychospiritual issues in addition to the traditional spectrum of counseling services.

Distinctiveness

"What distinguishes pastoral counseling from other forms of counseling and psychotherapy is the role and accountability of the counselor and his or her understanding and expression of the pastoral relationship.  Pastoral counselors are representatives of the central images of life and its meaning affirmed by their religious communities.  Thus pastoral counseling offers a relationship to that understanding of life and faith.  Pastoral counseling uses both psychological and theological resources to deepen its understanding of the pastoral relationship."  Membership in several organizations that combine theology and mental health has grown in recent years.  Some pastoral counselors have developed special training programs to encourage cooperation between religious professionals and medical professionals on treatment of issues like addiction, since spirituality is an important part of recovery for many people.

History
Pastoral counseling had its beginnings a separate discipline in North America in the first half of the twentieth century, as various religious organizations began to incorporate the insights and training of psychiatry, psychology and social work into the training of clergy. In 1925, Dr. Richard Cabot, a physician and adjunct at Harvard Divinity School, published an article in the Survey Graphic suggesting that every candidate for the ministry receive clinical training for pastoral work similar to the clinical training offered to medical students.  In the 1930s, the Rev. Anton Boisen began a program of placing theological students in supervised contact with mental patients.  In time, many seminaries and other training programs for religious professionals began to include clinical pastoral education as part of clerical training.  Also in the 1930s, the minister Norman Vincent Peale and the psychiatrist, Dr. Smiley Blanton, collaborated to form the American Foundation of Religion and Psychiatry, now known as the Blanton-Peale Institute. Today, hundreds of mental health centers with links to specific religious traditions may be found across North America.  In 1963, the American Association of Pastoral Counselors was founded to provide professional certification for pastoral counselors and pastoral counseling centers. In 2019, AAPC consolidated with ACPE.

See also
 Christian counseling
 Nouthetic counseling

References

Further reading

External links
 
 

Religious occupations
Practical theology
Counseling